Hokkaido Sapporo Minami High School (北海道札幌南高等学校, Hokkaidō Sapporo Minami Kōtō Gakkō) is a high school in Chuo-ku, Sapporo, Hokkaidō, Japan, founded in 1895. It is the top high school in Hokkaido.  There are approximately 1,100 students that attend the school.

The school is operated by the Hokkaido Prefectural Board of Education.
In 1995, the school replaced its old school building with a new facility.

Notable alumni

Misao Fujimura (1st Year (10th Grade) Only)
Satoru Iwata
Tadamasa Kodaira
Yasuharu Konishi
Yushi Soda
Tamiaki Yoneya
Genzō Wakayama
Junichi Watanabe

Nearby places
Toyohira River
Sapporo Ring Road

External links
Sapporo South High School

Chūō-ku, Sapporo
Educational institutions established in 1895
High schools in Sapporo
1895 establishments in Japan
High schools in Hokkaido